Applause (Latin , to strike upon, clap) is primarily a form of ovation or praise expressed by the act of clapping, or striking the palms of the hands together, in order to create noise. Audiences usually applaud after a performance, such as a musical concert, speech, or play, as a sign of enjoyment and approval.

History

The age of the custom of applauding is uncertain, but it is widespread among human cultures. The variety of its forms is limited only by the capacity for devising means of making a noise (e.g., stomping of feet or rapping of fists or hands on a table). Within each culture, however, it is usually subject to conventions.

The ancient Romans had set rituals at public performances to express degrees of approval: snapping the finger and thumb, clapping with the flat or hollow palm, and waving the flap of the toga. Emperor Aurelian substituted the waving of napkins that he had distributed to the Roman people for the toga flapping. In Roman theatre, at the close of the play, the chief actor called out "" (farewell and applaud), and the audience, guided by an unofficial choregos, chanted their approval antiphonally. This was often organized and paid for.

Similarly, a claque (French for "slapping") was an organized body of professional applauders in French theatres and opera houses who were paid by the performer(s) to create the illusion of an increased level of approval by the audience.

In Christianity, customs of the theatre were adopted by the churches. Eusebius says that Paul of Samosata encouraged the congregation to indicate approval of his preaching by waving linen cloths, and in the 4th and 5th centuries applause of the rhetoric of popular preachers had become an established custom.

Protocol and variations
Well-recognized politicians, actors, and musicians often receive applause as soon as they first appear on stage, even before any performance activity has transpired. This accolade is given to indicate admiration for their past achievements, and is not a response to the performance the audience is attending.

Applause during church services is traditionally regarded as taboo, in light of the sanctity of the proceedings; stress is on the aspect of worship rather than the personality of the individual preaching or singing during the service. This rule may be relaxed to permit applause in honor of the newly married couple when they may turn to be greeted by the congregation following the exchange of vows. Applause may also be permitted at certain services in honor of a specific individual, such as a baptism or the ordination of a new priest or minister. In less traditional congregations, particularly in contemporary, evangelical megachurches, a more casual atmosphere exists and applause may be encountered as frequently as at any secular performance.

Indiscriminate applause is widely considered a violation of classical music concert etiquette: Applause is discouraged between movements, reserved instead for the end of the entire work. There have been a number of attempts to further restrict applause in various circumstances, e.g., court theaters in Berlin prohibit applause during the performance and before the curtain call (although elsewhere in Germany this is felt to be beyond public tastes).

By contrast, opera performances have traditionally been interrupted by applause at the end of an aria or certain other set pieces, and many opera scores reflect a break in the music at places where applause would typically occur. Regarding this practice as a distraction, Wagner headed it off by eliminating breaks in the score within each act; the arias in his operas do not end in a "full stop" but flow into the next section of the music, until the end of the act is reached. Even then, in light of the quasi-religious atmosphere of the first act of Parsifal, it is traditional for the audience not to applaud at all at the end of that act, but file out of their seats in silence.

In most performances, if spectators really enjoy a performance, mainly in classical performances, they may also accompany by throwing flowers onstage.

On some occasions, applause occurs in the middle of an event. The president of the United States, in their State of the Union Address, is often interrupted by applause; tracking the number and duration of such interruptions has become a trend on various television news channels. It is often customary for jazz performers to receive applause in the middle of a tune, after completing an improvisational solo. It is also typical to applaud at the end of a musical number in a musical theatre piece.

Extended applause at the conclusion of an event, usually but not always resulting in a standing ovation, implies approval above and beyond ordinary measure, and compels the performer to return in acknowledgement and at times proceed to an encore.

A golf clap is a form of quiet clapping, so-named because it is the preferred form of applause for golfers; louder forms of applause are discouraged at golf tournaments so as not to disturb other golfers, who may be in the process of attempting a shot.  Golf claps are sometimes used at other events to heckle or to show sarcasm. Similarly, in the game of snooker, a good cue shot, a difficult pot, a 'snooker' which is difficult from which to escape, will be rewarded by the opponent tapping their cue several times on the table edge.

Likewise, string musicians of an orchestra use bobbing their bows in the air or gently tapping them on their instruments' strings as a substitute for applause. Wind section members will generally lightly stamp their feet or pat one hand on their leg to show approval to a conductor or soloist, while percussionists often rap drumsticks together.  An even more subtle form of approval may be exhibited by a member of an orchestra during a formal rehearsal or performance when a colleague performs particularly well, usually a slight shuffle of the foot on the floor or hand on the knee. These subtle forms of applause may not be recognized as such by the audience. Outright applause by performers for other performers, although increasingly common, is traditionally regarded as gauche, self-congratulatory, and usurping of the audience's prerogative (and sole task in this respect) to provide accolades when they feel that the performance merits it.

In skateboarding culture, when a fellow skater performs and lands a maneuver exceptionally well the observers will bang their own boards against the ground to express approval or encouragement.

In some countries, applause may be used to indicate respect for a recently deceased person in some instances, such as at a funeral procession. A recent phenomenon in Britain and Israel, is the use of a minute's applause, which has come to replace the traditional minute's silence. In the United Kingdom, it is especially at football matches, and in Israel also at basketball matches and other sports. However, in most countries, applause for a deceased person is still widely frowned upon and not recommended because it may be misinterpreted as rudeness or joy.

In Deaf culture, Deaf audiences will use a more visually expressive variant of clapping. Instead of clapping their palms together, they raise their hands straight up with outstretched fingers and twist their wrists. However, in a situation more specific to hearing culture, the traditional clap is used.

In German-speaking countries, it is customary for university students to rap their knuckles on the desks after each lecture. The same technique is used in German-speaking countries to express approval at meetings.

In Jamaica people may bang lids and pot covers together during celebratory events such as a victory at the Olympic Games or the Miss World competitions.

In legislative bodies
In the Parliament of the United Kingdom, clapping is generally prohibited. Instead, members of parliament and lords generally will shout "hear, hear!". In the House of Commons of Canada, by contrast, clapping is customary and frequent.

In air travel
In various countries, airplane passengers often tend to applaud the landing upon completion of a flight and when they have felt the plane's wheels' touchdown and have run a short but satisfactory course down the runway. The purpose of this custom is unclear.

Slow handclaps in film

Another type of "slow handclap" is used as a dramatic device, often forming the conclusion of dramatic turning points in films. After some dramatic speech, one audience member claps slowly, then another, and then a few more, until the trickle of clapping gives way to roaring applause, often ending in a standing ovation. This is also referred to as a crescendo applause, named for the increasing level of volume it produces.

See also
Acclamation
Booing
Cheering
Clapping
Concert etiquette
Standing ovation
Ululation
Applause sign

References

External links 

The dynamics of audience applause, Journal of the Royal Society Interface, May 29, 2013, Richard P. Mann, Jolyon Faria, David J. T. Sumpter, and Jens Krause

Hand gestures
Human communication
Gestures of respect